Saleeby is a surname. Notable people with the surname include:

Caleb Saleeby (1878–1940), English physician, writer, and journalist
Elias Saleeby, Liberian banker
Najeeb Mitry Saleeby (1870–1935), Lebanese-American physician

See also
 Saleby

Surnames of African origin